"Spread Your Wings" is a song by Queen from their album News of the World. The phrase may also refer to:
"Spread Your Wings", a song by Gotthard from their album Bang!
"Spread Your Wings", a song by Robbie Williams from his album Intensive Care
"Spread Your Wings", an episode of the television series Modern Family